Paul Ourry may refer to:

 Paul Henry Ourry (1719–1783), Royal Navy officer and British politician
 Paul Treby Ourry (1758–1783), British politician